Camillo Mac Bica is an American philosopher, poet, activist, and author.

Biography

Bica was born on January 7, 1947, in Brooklyn. He received a BA from Long Island University in 1968, an MA from New York University in 1986, a Master's of Philosophy in 1993 from City University of New York, and a Ph.D. in Philosophy from the City University of New York in 1995. Since 1990, he has served as a professor at the School of Visual Arts (SVA) in New York City where he teaches courses in philosophy, peace studies, and war. In 2003, he was awarded SVA’s Distinguished Scholar-Teacher Award.

In 1964 Bica enlisted in the United States Marine Corps Platoon Leader Officer Candidate Program and upon graduation from college in 1968 was commissioned a 2nd Lieutenant. He spent three years on active duty as a Marine Corps Officer, serving 13 months with the 26th Marine Infantry Regiment in Vietnam.

Upon his discharge from active duty, Bica spent many years recovering from his service in Vietnam eventually founding, with a number of other Veterans, and coordinating for six years, the very successful Veterans Self-Help Initiative, AKA The HOOTCH Program, at the Department of Veterans Affairs Medical Center in Brooklyn. He is a long time member of the Vietnam Veterans Against the War and Coordinator of the Long Island Chapter of Veterans For Peace.

Bica has authored over fifty articles dealing with social policy, the ethics of war, posttraumatic stress disorder, moral injury,<ref>Soul Repair: Recovering from Moral Injury after War, Rita Nakashima Brock, Gabriella Lettini, Beacon Press (November 5, 2013)</ref> and related topics published in the Humanist Magazine, numerous alternative news sites such as Truthout.org, OpEd News, Common Dreams, AlterNet, and numerous philosophical journals. The first installment of Bica’s War Legacy Series,  Worthy of Gratitude: Why Veterans May Not Want to be Thanked for their Service in War, was published in 2015. The Second book in the series, Beyond PTSD: The Moral Casualties of War, was published in early 2016.

In 2010, Bica testified at the Truth Commission on Conscience in War at the Riverside Church in New York City. He currently serves on the National Advisory Board of the Soul Repair Center, a think tank dedicated to research and public education about recovery from moral injury from war located at Brite Divinity School in Fort Worth, Texas.

Books
 2015: Worthy of Gratitude: Why Veterans May Not Want to be Thanked for their Service in War. .
 2016: Beyond PTSD: The Moral Casualties of War''.

Articles 
 Meeting With the Enemy: Vietnam From a Vietnamese Perspective
 Don't Thank Me for My Service
 Blood On All Our Hands: Don't Thank Me For My Service Redux
When Soldiers Say No To War
Protected Speech?
Inappropriate Art: "Open Casket" and "Portraits of Courage"
Whose "Truth" Matters Most When We Recount the War in Vietnam?
“Thank You for Saving My Son From All the Grief and Pain!”

References

External links 

Official Website
Author's Page
Peace Vet Blog

1947 births
Living people
United States Marine Corps personnel of the Vietnam War
Poets from New York (state)
Writers from Brooklyn
Long Island University alumni
New York University alumni
City University of New York alumni
United States Marine Corps officers
American anti–Vietnam War activists
School of Visual Arts faculty
Activists from New York (state)